Il trafficone is a 1974 Italian commedia sexy all'italiana written and directed by Bruno Corbucci and starring Carlo Giuffré.

Plot
A Neapolitan Vincenzo LoRusso that lives of expedients in Rome, as he tries to sell at an intersection a faux suede jacket, accidentally meets Laura, a beautiful woman who invites him to her house. Between the two it is now a passion, but the unexpected arrival of her husband will be the beginning for Vincenzo a new experience as it will be paid by it to have been caught in bed with his wife, and unlocked it from its psychological impotence. Well briefed by the modern couple of theories of William Masters and Virginia Johnson, though without real expertise will open a sexology center to solve the problems of couples and to earn as much without ever having to make do to support his family.

Cast 

Carlo Giuffré: Vincenzo LoRusso / Dr. Gaetano D'Angelo
Marilù Tolo: Rosalia 
Tina Aumont: Laura Vitali
Adriana Asti: Virginia 
Enzo Cannavale: Gennaro 
Rita Calderoni: Angela, Vincenzo's wife
Lino Banfi:  Luigi Scardocchia
Irina Maleeva: Silvana Scardocchia
Gianni Agus: On. Rivolta
Elio Zamuto: Baron Vito Macaluso
Vincenzo Crocitti : Bastiano
Pamela Villoresi : Bastiano's wife
Renzo Marignano: Count Everardo 
Mino Guerrini: Judge Filiberto Vettiglia
Giancarlo Badessi : The Major
Bruno Corbucci : On. Licanzi
Massimo Dapporto : Paziente filmato

References

External links

1974 films
Commedia sexy all'italiana
1970s sex comedy films
Films directed by Bruno Corbucci
Adultery in films
1974 comedy films
1970s Italian-language films
1970s Italian films